St. Leon is a town in Kelso Township, Dearborn County, Indiana, United States. The population was 678 at the 2010 census.

It is also home to a wiffleball tournament, Wifflerama.

History
A post office was established at St. Leon in 1852, and remained in operation until it was discontinued in 1955. The town was likely named for St. Leon Bembo.

Geography
St. Leon is located at  (39.287360, -84.967108).

Demographics

2010 census
As of the census of 2010, there were 678 people, 252 households, and 182 families living in the town. The racial makeup of the town was 98.1% White, 0.1% African American, 0.6% Asian, 0.4% from other races, and 0.7% from two or more races. Hispanic or Latino of any race were 0.3% of the population.

There were 252 households, of which 36.5% had children under the age of 18 living with them, 59.1% were married couples living together, 9.5% had a female householder with no husband present, 3.6% had a male householder with no wife present, and 27.8% were non-families. 24.2% of all households were made up of individuals, and 9.9% had someone living alone who was 65 years of age or older. The average household size was 2.69 and the average family size was 3.23.

The median age in the town was 36.2 years. 26.8% of residents were under the age of 18; 9% were between the ages of 18 and 24; 24.9% were from 25 to 44; 26.2% were from 45 to 64; and 13.1% were 65 years of age or older. The gender makeup of the town was 50.0% male and 50.0% female.

2000 census
As of the census of 2000, there were 387 people, 133 households, and 109 families living in the town. There were 139 housing units at an average density of 19.4 per square mile (7.5/km). The racial makeup of the town was 99.74% White and 0.26% Asian.

There were 133 households, out of which 35.3% had children under the age of 18 living with them, 74.4% were married couples living together, 6.0% had a female householder with no husband present, and 17.3% were non-families. 15.8% of all households were made up of individuals, and 8.3% had someone living alone who was 65 years of age or older. The average household size was 2.91 and the average family size was 3.25.

In the town, the population was spread out, with 27.1% under the age of 18, 7.2% from 18 to 24, 25.6% from 25 to 44, 23.8% from 45 to 64, and 16.3% who were 65 years of age or older. The median age was 38 years. For every 100 females, there were 107.0 males. For every 100 females age 18 and over, there were 104.3 males.

The median income for a household in the town was $39,821, and the median income for a family was $52,000. Males had a median income of $42,500 versus $19,107 for females. The per capita income for the town was $19,225. About 5.7% of families and 8.4% of the population were below the poverty line, including 18.6% of those under age 18 and none of those age 65 or over.

Education
St. Leon, Indiana, is served by East Central High School which draws from many surrounding areas as well.

References

External links
 St. Leon, Indiana - Dearborn County Department of Planning and Zoning

Towns in Dearborn County, Indiana
Towns in Indiana